Sarah Gillis is an American engineer who is scheduled to fly on Polaris Dawn, a private space mission. If the trip goes ahead as planned in early 2023, she will become the youngest American to reach orbit.

Early life and education
Gillis graduated from Shining Mountain Waldorf School in Boulder, Colorado in June 2012. She obtained a degree in aerospace engineering from University of Colorado Boulder on the advice of her mentor, former NASA astronaut Joseph R. Tanner.

Career
In 2015, while at the University of Colorado Boulder, Gillis began an internship at SpaceX, working on human-in-the-loop testing of the Dragon spacecraft before moving full-time to the astronaut training program.

She is a lead space operations engineer at SpaceX, responsible for overseeing the astronaut training program for the company's Crew Dragon vehicles. She prepared NASA astronauts for the first Demo-2 and Crew-1 missions and more recently directly trained Inspiration4 astronauts, the first all-civilian crew to go into orbit. Gillis is an experienced Mission Control Operator, who has supported real-time operations for Dragon's cargo resupply missions to and from the International Space Station as a Navigation Officer and as Crew Operations and Resources Engineer (CORE) for crew Dragon missions, the SpaceX equivalent of the NASA CAPCOM role.

Gillis is scheduled to fly on Polaris Dawn, a private spaceflight funded by Jared Isaacman.

Media coverage
Gillis appears in episodes 3, 4 and 5 in the 2021 Netflix series Countdown: Inspiration4 Mission to Space.

References

See also 
 Polaris program

Living people
Commercial astronauts
Space tourists
Inspiration4
University of Colorado Boulder alumni
SpaceX people
1994 births